Matilda Algotsson (born 29 May 1998) is a Swedish figure skater. She is the 2017 CS Nebelhorn Trophy silver medalist, the 2015 Volvo Open Cup champion, and the 2019 Swedish national champion. She placed 13th at the 2016 and 2017 European Championships.

Personal life 
Matilda Algotsson was born on 29 May 1998 in Stockholm, Sweden. The middle child of Johanna and Anders Algotsson, she has an older sister, Emma, and younger brother, Rickard.

Career 
Algotsson started skating in 2003.

2013–2014 season 
In the 2013–2014 season, Algotsson won the Swedish national junior title and three international medals on the junior level – bronze at the Toruń Cup, silver at the Sarajevo Open, and bronze at the Nordics. She was assigned to represent Sweden at the 2014 World Junior Championships in Sofia, Bulgaria, but was eliminated after placing 28th in the short program.

2014–2015 season 
In 2014–2015, Algotsson debuted on the ISU Junior Grand Prix series, placing 20th in Japan. She repeated as the Swedish national junior champion and won junior gold at the Nordics.

2015–2016 season 
Algotsson placed 7th at her 2015 JGP assignment in Zagreb, Croatia. Making her senior international debut, she won gold at the Volvo Open Cup in November 2015. After winning the senior bronze medal at the Swedish Championships, she was named in Sweden's team to the 2016 European Championships in Bratislava, Slovakia. Ranked 18th in the short program, she qualified for the free skate where she placed 10th, lifting her to 13th overall. At the 2016 World Junior Championships, she placed 30th in the short program and did not advance further.

2016–2017 season 
Algotsson was awarded the silver medal at the Swedish Championships, having placed second to Joshi Helgesson. She reached the free skate at the 2017 European Championships in Ostrava, Czech Republic.

2017–2018 season 
A week before the competition, Sweden decided that Algotsson would replace Joshi Helgesson at the 2017 CS Nebelhorn Trophy. It was the final qualifying opportunity for the 2018 Winter Olympics. Algotsson won the silver medal and earned a spot for Sweden in the ladies' event at the Olympics. Algotsson obtained the silver medal in the Swedish national championships and did not reach the final in the European Championships.

2018–2019 season 
Algotsson participated in her first senior Grand Prix event, 2018 Internationaux de France, finishing 12th. She won the gold medal at the 2018 Swedish Figure Skating Championships.

2019–2020 season 
For the first time, she finished off the podium at the 2019 Swedish Figure Skating Championships.  Despite this, she was assigned to compete at the World Championships in Montreal, but these were cancelled as a result of the coronavirus pandemic.

Programs

Competitive highlights 
CS: Challenger Series; JGP: Junior Grand Prix

References

External links 
 

1998 births
Swedish female single skaters
Living people
Sportspeople from Stockholm
21st-century Swedish women